The women's 49 kg  competition in taekwondo at the 2000 Summer Olympics in Sydney took place on September 27 at the State Sports Centre.

26-year-old  Lauren Burns thrilled the Aussie home crowd inside the venue, as she crushed Cuban fighter Urbia Melendez 4–2 to earn the women's flyweight title on the first day of the sport's major Olympic debut. Meanwhile, Chinese Taipei's Chi Shu-ju prevailed a bronze medal victory over Denmark's Hanne Høgh Poulsen with a score of 4–0.

Competition format
The main bracket consisted of a single elimination tournament, culminating in the gold medal match. The taekwondo fighters eliminated in earlier rounds by the two finalists of the main bracket advanced directly to the repechage tournament. These matches determined the bronze medal winner for the event.

Schedule
All times are Greece Standard Time (UTC+2)

Competitors

Results
Legend
PTG — Won by points gap
SUP — Won by superiority
OT — Won on over time (Golden Point)
WO — Walkover

Main bracket

Repechage

References

External links
Official Report

Women's 049 kg
Olymp
Women's events at the 2000 Summer Olympics